Kundasang is a hill station in the district of Ranau in Sabah, Malaysia that lies along the bank of Kundasang Valley within the Crocker Range, and also neighboring the town of Pekan Nabalu. It is located about 6 kilometres away from Kinabalu National Park, 12 kilometres from Ranau town and is renowned for its vegetable market which is open seven days a week. It is the closest town to Mount Kinabalu and has a panoramic view of the mountain. It is populated mainly by the native Dusun and a small population of Chinese people. Almost all the shops are operated by locals.

At an elevation of almost 1,900 m (6,200 ft), it is the highest settlement in Malaysia. Kundasang is also famously known as the New Zealand of Borneo for its unique mountainous geographical terrain almost similar to New Zealand.

Kundasang War Memorial and Gardens 

The memorial is on a hill immediately behind the vegetable wholesale stalls. Major G. S. Carter, D.S.O. (Toby Carter) a New Zealander employed with Shell Oil Co. (Borneo) initiated the building of the Memorial in 1962, together with the launching of Kinabalu Park to commemorate the 2,428 Australian and British prisoners who died during World War II at the Sandakan POW Camp, and the casualties of the three infamous forced death marches from Sandakan to Ranau. It also serves as a tribute to the many local people who risked their lives while aiding the prisoners of war. Only six Australians survived in this tragedy to tell their horror and there were no English survivors.

The fort-like Memorial was designed by J.C. Robinson, a local architect. It has four interlocking but separate gardens to represent the homelands of those who died: an Australian Garden, a formal English Garden of roses, a Borneo Garden with wild flowers of Kinabalu and at the top level is the 'Contemplation Garden' with a reflection pool and pergola.

To commemorate the 60th anniversary of the end of World War II, the Memorial was restored in 2005 by Mr Sevee Charuruks and with his own personal funds. No government funding was available during the major restoration project in 2005. However, years later help came from the Australian Government in the form of several grants.

The Australian Government Grants aided in:
 The building of a perimeter fence around the Memorial. The Estimated grant: RM$120,000 
 The building of the Australian Memorial Hall to enable visitors to view WW2 Documentary Films. The Estimated grant: RM$350,000
 The Demolishment & Re-construction of concrete wall of Contemplation Garden. The Estimated grant: RM$120,000
 The Construction of Confrontation Memorial. The Estimated grant: RM$14,000

In recognition of his hard work and commitment to the Kundasang War Memorial, in 2007 Queen Elizabeth II awarded Mr Charuruks the MBE (Member of the Most Excellent Order of the British Empire). Later in 2012, the Australian Government awarded Mr Charuruks the Member of the Order of Australia (AM).

The Gardens have been replanted with flowers, particularly roses and rare orchids that include the Paphiopedilum rothschildianum (Rothschild's slipper orchid). The Memorial is open to all visitors not only to view the gardens but to remember those who sacrificed their lives for the freedom of others.

ANZAC Memorial Services and private Memorial Services are welcomed with prior arrangements. The Memorial is open to visitors with minimal entrance fees charged. An access road with ramp allows easy access for wheelchair users.

Vegetable wholesale stalls 

Beside the main road vegetables wholesalers can be found in a long row of wooden stalls (Malay: gerai). Bulk buyers come from all over the state of Sabah, Sarawak and even Brunei for the fresh harvest. Pick up trucks are seen laden fully with harvest from the farms nearby the valley and delivered to the stalls. Passing tourists and travellers also stop by the road for shopping at a good bargain with the stalls are open seven days a week.

Golf course 
The Kundasang golf course is located near the border of Kinabalu National Park at an altitude of approximately 2000 metres above sea level.

External links

 
 Kundasang Town
  War Memorial Gardens
  Places of Interest (Chinese)

Towns in Sabah